Wim Neefs (born 8 March 1976) is a Belgian former professional tennis player.

Neefs made his only ATP Tour main draw appearance in the doubles at the 1997 European Community Championships, which was held in his home province of Antwerp. He won two doubles titles on the ATP Challenger Tour.

Challenger titles

Doubles: (2)

References

External links
 
 

1976 births
Living people
Belgian male tennis players
Sportspeople from Antwerp Province
21st-century Belgian people